Install may refer to:

Technology

 install (Unix), a command line tool for installing files
 INSTALL, a CONFIG.SYS directive

See also 
 Installation (disambiguation)